Tycheró is a town and a former municipality in the Evros regional unit, East Macedonia and Thrace, Greece. Since the 2011 local government reform it is part of the municipality Soufli, of which it is a municipal unit. The municipal unit has an area of 220.411 km2. Population 4,010 (2011).  Tychero is situated near the river Evros, which forms the border with Turkey here.

History
Under Ottoman rule Tychero was known as Bıdıklı (Greek: Μπίντικλι). After the Balkan Wars (1912-1913) it became part of Bulgaria, and it became part of Greece in 1920. It was renamed to Tychio, which was changed to the current name Tychero in 1953. In February 2006 Tychero was struck by a flood of the Evros river. The town is populated by Arvanites originally from Ibriktepe, now in Turkey.

Subdivisions
The municipal unit Tychero is subdivided into the following communities (constituent villages in brackets):
Fylakto
Lefkimmi
Lyra
Provatonas (Provatonas, Tavri, Thymaria)
Tychero

Population

Transport

Road
The Greek National Road 51/E85 (Alexandroupoli - Orestiada - Ormenio) passes west of the town. Tychero is located south of Soufli, south-southwest of Orestiada, northwest of İpsala (Turkey), north of Feres and northeast of Alexandroupoli.

Rail
The settlement is served by a railway station on the Alexandroupoli–Svilengrad line.

External links
Tychero (municipality) on GTP Travel Pages
Tychero (town) on GTP Travel Pages

References

Populated places in Evros (regional unit)

Albanian communities of Western Thrace